Lot or LOT or The Lot or similar may refer to:

Common meanings

Areas
Land lot, an area of land
Parking lot, for automobiles
Backlot, in movie production

Sets of items
Lot number, in batch production
Lot, a set of goods for sale together in an auction; or a quantity of a financial instrument

Chance
Sortition (drawing lots)
Cleromancy, divination by casting lots
Arabian lots, or Arabic parts, an astrological divination technique

People
Lot (name), including a list of people with the given name

Characters
Lot (biblical person), figure in the Book of Genesis
King Lot, in Arthurian legend

Places
Lot, Belgium, a village in the municipality of Beersel
Lot (department), in southwest France
Lot (river), in southern France
Lostock railway station, Bolton, England
Lewis University Airport, Illinois, United States
 The Lot, the current name of Samuel Goldwyn Studio

Arts and media
"Lot", a story by Ward Moore
Backlot, in movie production
 The Lot, is a short-lived AMC television series.
 The Lot (album), a 2013 compilation album by Roger Taylor
 The Lot Radio, an online radio station in New York City
, a character in the Dutch television show Sesamstraat (Sesame Street)
 "Lot", by Christie Front Drive from Christie Front Drive, 1994

Other uses
Lot (unit), a unit of mass
Large Orbiting Telescope, the Hubble Space Telescope
LOT Polish Airlines, the flag carrier airline of Poland
lot, a device for steering a boat, as mentioned in Belyana
Language of thought, a philosophical hypothesis
The LOT Network Solution, a membership organization to avoid patent litigation

See also

 On the Lot, a 2007 reality television show

LOTS (disambiguation)
Lott (disambiguation)
Lotte (disambiguation)
Lottie (disambiguation)
IOT (disambiguation)